The Cadillac Provoq is a concept luxury crossover vehicle that was revealed on 8 January 2008, and manufactured by Cadillac. It was introduced at the 2008 Consumer Electronics Show in Las Vegas, Nevada and is powered by the plug-in hybrid technology first shown in the Chevrolet Volt. For extended range, a hydrogen fuel cell will recharge the Lithium-ion battery and a solar panel will power onboard accessories, such as interior lighting and the audio system. As the Provoq concept uses a hybrid powertrain it is based on the same GM Voltec platform as the Chevrolet Volt.

The production car shares the GM Theta platform with the Saab 9-4X. The production-spec Provoq was intended to be a replacement for the SRX, named BRX, but Cadillac retained the SRX nameplate for the new vehicle.

References 

Provoq

lt:Cadillac BRX